Taslim Arif Abbasi (1 May 1954 – 14 March 2008) was a Pakistani cricketer who played in six Test matches and 2 One Day Internationals (ODIs) in 1980. His score of 210* for Pakistan against Australia stood for more than 20 years as the highest score made by a wicket-keeper in Test cricket, until broken by Sri Lankan Kumar Sangakkara.  Arif died in Karachi from a lung infection in 2008.  He was buried at Faisal Cantonment cemetery in Karachi. He is survived by two sons and a daughter: Imran Arif, who lives in London; Ainan Arif, who is himself a cricketer who plays for the National Bank of Pakistan; and Marium Arif, who lives in the United States of America.

He went to a local government school in P.I.B colony Karachi. After finishing his matriculation he was admitted to National College Karachi on the basis of his cricket record. He continued to play for the college team in intercollegiate matches. His mentor Professor Mukarram Ali Khan Shirwani played a major role in introducing him to several selectors as an outstanding and budding wicketkeeper batsman. During his days in the college he had several team members who gained national duties. One of his teammates was Mohsin Hassan Khan who played for Pakistan as an opener and later became a national coach. Along with most of his teammates he was against political parties involvement in students politics. He actively supported Fasahat Ali Khan against Hussain Haqani of Islami Jamiate Talaba by bringing in the entire sports teams to vote which resulted in Fasahat winning the students union elections.

Record
In September 1978, playing for National Bank against Punjab in Lahore, before he had made his international debut, Arif became the first Pakistani wicket keeper to effect ten dismissals in a first-class match. His record was later broken by Wasim Yousoufi in 1997.

References

External links
 

1954 births
2008 deaths
Cricketers from Karachi
Taslim Arif
Taslim Arif
Taslim Arif
Taslim Arif
Taslim Arif
Infectious disease deaths in Sindh
World Series Cricket players
Pakistani cricketers
Karachi Blues cricketers
Karachi Whites cricketers
Wicket-keepers